The 1983–84 Midland Football Combination season was the 47th in the history of Midland Football Combination, a football competition in England.

At the end of the previous season the Midland Combination divisions were renamed, as Division One was renamed the Premier Division, Division Two became Division One and Division Three became Division Two.

Premier Division

The Premier Division featured 17 clubs which competed in Division One last season along with three new clubs, promoted from Division Two:
Kings Heath
Southam United
Studley Sporting

Also, Knowle changed name to Knowle North Star.

League table

References

1983–84
8